The Casluhim or Casluhites were an ancient Egyptian people mentioned in the Bible and related literature.

Biblical accounts
According to the Book of Genesis and the Books of Chronicles, the Casluhim were descendants of Mizraim (Egypt) son of Ham, out of whom originated the Philistines.

Archaeology
The Egyptian form of their name is preserved in the inscriptions of the Temple of Kom Ombo as the region name Kasluḥet. In the Aramaic Targums their region is called Pentpolitai understood to be derived from the Greek Pentapolis which locates the area as the north west in what is now the Cyrenaica region of Libya. Another name for their region is Pekosim used in Bereshit Rabbah 37.

Ancient literature
Josephus mentions the Casluhim in his Jewish Antiquities I, vi, 2 as one of the Egyptian peoples whose cities were destroyed during the Ethiopic War and who thus disappeared from history. Arab historian Ibn Khaldun (1332–1406), citing Abu Bakr bin Yahya al-Suli, wrote that the Berbers of North Africa were descended from Casluhim, the son of Mizraïm (قبط بن مصر).

See also
 Generations of Noah

References

 
Noach (parashah)
Mizraim